Phenpromethamine (former brand name Vonedrine), also known as N,β-dimethylphenethylamine, is a sympathomimetic nasal decongestant of the phenethylamine group. It was previously marketed as a nasal inhaler from 1943 through 1960 but is no longer available. The medication is a stimulant and is banned by the World Anti-Doping Agency. It has been detected in dietary supplements starting in the 2010s.

See also 
 β-Methylphenethylamine
 Methamphetamine
 N-Methylphenethylamine

References 

Abandoned drugs
Phenethylamines
Norepinephrine-dopamine releasing agents